Coedydd Dyffryn Alwen is a Site of Special Scientific Interest in the preserved county of Clwyd, north Wales.

It contains a mix of different woodland types, reflecting the underlying geology and soil type, including ash, oak and rowan, with a hazel understorey, with a rich ground flora including globe flower, oak and beech fern.

See also
List of Sites of Special Scientific Interest in Clwyd

References

Sites of Special Scientific Interest in Clwyd